Deh Soltan (also Romanized as Deh Solţān, Deh-e Solţān, and Deh-i-Sultān) is a village in Hoseynabad-e Kordehha Rural District, in the Central District of Aradan County, Semnan Province, Iran. At the 2006 census, its population was 333, in 101 families.

References 

Populated places in Aradan County